John Leslie Burrough (born May 17, 1972) is a former American football defensive lineman in the National Football League. After playing college football at Washington State and Wyoming, Burrough was drafted by the Atlanta Falcons in the 7th round (245th overall) of the 1995 NFL Draft. He played seven seasons for the Atlanta Falcons (1995–1998), the Minnesota Vikings (1999–2000), and the  St. Louis Rams (2002).

References

1972 births
Living people
People from Laramie, Wyoming
Players of American football from Wyoming
American football defensive linemen
Washington State Cougars football players
Wyoming Cowboys football players
Atlanta Falcons players
Minnesota Vikings players
St. Louis Rams players